Wellington Football Club may refer to:

Association football
 The original name of Woodlands Wellington FC, a professional club based in Singapore, which was used between 1988 and 1995
 Wellington Phoenix FC, a professional club based in Wellington, New Zealand
 University-Mount Wellington, a club in Auckland, New Zealand
 North Wellington AFC, an amateur club based in the northern suburbs of Wellington, New Zealand
 Wellington United, based in Wellington, New Zealand
 Wellington Marist, based in Wellington, New Zealand
 Wellington Olympic AFC, a semi-professional club in Wellington, New Zealand
 Wellington A.F.C., a football club based in Wellington, Somerset, England
 Wellington F.C. (Herefords), based in the village of Wellington, Herefordshire, England
 Wellington People F.C., based in Wellington, Sierra Leone
 Wellington Recreation F.C. (also known as Wellington Rec.), based in Larne, County Antrim, Northern Ireland
 Wellington Town F.C., the former name of Telford United F.C.
 Team Wellington, a New Zealand semi-professional football club

Rugby union
 Wellington FC, the longest continuous playing rugby union club in New Zealand; see Wellington Rugby Football Union
 Mt Wellington RFC, based in Auckland, New Zealand